Conneaut is a former New York Central (originally a Lake Shore and Michigan Southern) train station in the U.S. town of Conneaut, Ohio. It was built in 1900 by the Lake Shore and Michigan Southern as a replacement for an older wooden depot, then acquired by the New York Central Railroad in 1914, along with the rest of the LS&MS. The passenger depot building has housed the Conneaut Historical Railroad Museum since 1964, and has a display track with the Nickel Plate Road #755 Berkshire steam engine. The station has been registered as the Lake Shore And Michigan Southern Passenger Depot on the National Register of Historic Places since March 27, 1975. The freight house connected to the station is operated by the Conneaut Area Historical Society.

See also
Ashtabula River railroad disaster

References

External links

YouTube video of Nickel Plate Road 755 (Museum Tour), 08-17-2012, retrieved June 26,2015 
Conneaut Chapter and Railroad Museum (National Railroad Historical Society)
Official Facebook Page
Railfanning Road Trips (USA RailGuide - TrainWeb)
Conneaut Railroad Museum (HawkinsRails.Net)

Railway stations on the National Register of Historic Places in Ohio
Railroad museums in Ohio
Railway stations in the United States opened in 1900
National Register of Historic Places in Ashtabula County, Ohio
Former New York Central Railroad stations
1900 establishments in Ohio
Railway stations closed in 1962
Former railway stations in Ohio
station